is a passenger railway station located in the town of Shin'onsen, Mikata District, Hyōgo, Japan, operated by West Japan Railway Company (JR West).

Lines

Station layout
The station consists of one ground-level side platform serving a single bi-directional track. The station is unattended. The station formerly had a side platform and an island platform connected by a  footbridge; however, the island platform, footbridge and old station building were all demolished in 2019.

Adjacent stations

History
Igumi Station opened on November 10, 1911.

Passenger statistics
In fiscal 2016, the station was used by an average of 11 passengers daily

Surrounding area
Igumi is a relatively large village facing the Sea of Japan, but the station is about 800m away from the village on the mountain side, and there are almost no private houses around the station.

See also
List of railway stations in Japan

References

External links

 Station Official Site

Railway stations in Hyōgo Prefecture
Sanin Main Line
Railway stations in Japan opened in 1911
Shin'onsen, Hyōgo